The 1824 United States presidential election in Kentucky took place between October 26 and December 2, 1824, as part of the 1824 United States presidential election. Voters chose 14 representatives, or electors to the Electoral College, who voted for President and Vice President.

During this election, the Democratic-Republican Party was the only major national party, and four different candidates from this party sought the Presidency. Kentucky voted for Henry Clay over Andrew Jackson, John Quincy Adams, and William H. Crawford. Clay won Kentucky, his home state, by a wide margin of 45.54%.

Results

References

Kentucky
1824
1824 Kentucky elections